Disney Illuminations is a nighttime spectacular at Disneyland Park in Disneyland Paris. It opened on 26 March 2017 to celebrate the 25th anniversary of the park and replaced Disney Dreams!. Based on Ignite the Dream, the former nighttime spectacular at Shanghai Disneyland, the show features projection mapping onto the park's castle, fireworks, water fountains, fire, music, lasers, searchlights, and other special effects.

Plot summary 
The show starts with a voice-over, inviting all guests to release their inner child and dream: "Within each of us is a dreamer, just waiting to be awakened. We all have the magic to unlock this inner child. But sometimes, that inner child needs an invitation to come out and play. This is your invitation... to dream."

The music played during this opening and the finale of the show is "A Dream Is a Wish Your Heart Makes" from Cinderella, and is performed by Heather Headley.

Like other Disney fireworks shows, various songs from Disney-related films are then showcased, including:
 Circle of Life and Can You Feel the Love Tonight from The Lion King
 Part of Your World from The Little Mermaid
 Fronds Like These and The Turtle Lope from Finding Nemo
 He's a Pirate from Pirates of the Caribbean
 Prologue and How Does a Moment Last Forever from Beauty and the Beast
 When You Wish Upon a Star from Pinocchio
 Main Title and March of the Resistance from Star Wars
 Let It Go, For the First Time in Forever, and Vuelie from Frozen
 A Dream Is a Wish Your Heart Makes from Cinderella
 If You Can Dream from Disney Princess

Show history 

The show soft-launched on 25 March 2017 at the start of the Disneyland Paris' 25th anniversary celebrations, with its official launch on 26 March 2017.

Illuminations was suspended from 12 March 2020 shortly prior to the park's closure during the COVID-19 pandemic in France; it appeared as a "Disneyland Paris Watch Party" on YouTube with a full video.

After a brief reopening from 21 December 2021 to 2 January 2022, it was suspended again due to French government regulations on large gatherings. The show reopened on 16 February and was paused on 11 November for the 2022–2023 Christmas season. A revival of Disney Dreams! of Christmas temporarily replaced the show from 12 November to 8 January 2023. Illuminations then returned on 9 January 2023.

On 10 January 2023, it was announced that its predecessor Disney Dreams! will be revived and replace Illuminations starting 12 April as part of the resort's 30th Anniversary "Grand Finale".

Technology 
The show is known to use a large amount of audio-visual, lighting, pyrotechnic and hydro-technic technology, mostly installed for the preceding Disney Dreams! show.

Projection 
The castle is covered with projectors, and uses a much wider area than the previous Disney Dreams!, utilizing the hills around the castle as well as the castle itself.

Drones 
In a Disney Parks first, choreographed lighted drone technology is used during a new, specially-designed pre-show sequence for the park's 30th anniversary in 2022. Called "Disney D-Light", the new sequence uses 150 drones that recreated the Mickey Mouse-shaped 30th Anniversary logo above Le Château de la Belle au Bois Dormant. "Disney D-Light" is set to an original score and arrangement by Rick McKee that uses themes from Inside Out, Hercules, Moana, and other Disney films, as well as the anniversary's theme song "Un monde qui s'illumine" (written by Chantry Johnson, Noemie Legrand, and Tony Ferrari, and performed by Héloïse). The score was recorded at Abbey Road Studios by The London Symphony Orchestra.

The original version of the pre-show (and post-show called "Afterglow", now folded into the "Disney D-Light" pre-show) debuted ahead of the celebration's launch, on 5 March 2022.

See also 
 Disney Dreams!
 Celebrate the Magic
 Celebrate! Tokyo Disneyland
 World of Color
 Remember... Dreams Come True
 Once Upon a Time
 Ignite the Dream: A Nighttime Spectacular of Magic and Light

References

External links 
 Official website

Walt Disney Parks and Resorts fireworks
Disneyland Park (Paris)
Walt Disney Parks and Resorts entertainment